Field Marshal (FM) has been the highest rank in the British Army since 1736. A five-star rank with NATO code OF-10, it is equivalent to an Admiral of the Fleet in the Royal Navy or a Marshal of the Royal Air Force in the Royal Air Force (RAF). A Field Marshal's insignia consists of two crossed batons surrounded by yellow leaves below St Edward's Crown. Like Marshals of the RAF and Admirals of the Fleet, Field Marshals traditionally remain officers for life, though on half-pay when not in an appointment. The rank has been used sporadically throughout its history and was vacant during parts of the 18th and 19th centuries (when all former holders of the rank were deceased). After the Second World War, it became standard practice to appoint the Chief of the Imperial General Staff (later renamed Chief of the General Staff) to the rank on his last day in the post. Army officers occupying the post of Chief of the Defence Staff, the professional head of all the British Armed Forces, were usually promoted to the rank upon their appointment.

In total, 141 men have held the rank of field marshal. The majority led careers in the British Army or the colonial Indian Army, rising through the ranks to eventually become a field marshal. Some members of the British Royal Family—most recently Prince Edward, Duke of Kent, and Charles III—were promoted to the rank after shorter periods of service. Three British monarchs—George V, Edward VIII, and George VI— assumed the rank on their accessions to the throne, while Edward VII and Charles III were already field marshals, and two British consorts—Albert, Prince Consort and Prince Philip, Duke of Edinburgh—were appointed by their respective queens. Other ceremonial appointments were made as diplomatic gestures. Twelve foreign monarchs held the honour, though three (Wilhelm II, German Emperor; Franz Joseph I, Austrian Emperor; and Hirohito, Emperor of Japan) were stripped of it when their countries became enemies of Britain and her allies in the two world wars. Also awarded the rank were one Frenchman (Ferdinand Foch) and one Australian (Sir Thomas Blamey), honoured for their contributions to World War I and World War II respectively, and one South African statesman (Jan Smuts).

A report commissioned by the Ministry of Defence in 1995 made a number of recommendations for financial savings in the armed forces' budget, one of which was the abolition of the five-star ranks. Part of the rationale was that these ranks were disproportionate to the size of the forces commanded by these officers and that none of the United Kingdom's close allies, such as the United States (which reserves the rank of general of the army for officers who have commanded large armies in major wars), used such ranks. The recommendation was not taken up in full, but the practice of promoting service chiefs to five-star ranks was stopped and the ranks are now reserved for special circumstances. Sir Peter Inge was, in 1994, the last active officer to be promoted to the rank. Inge relinquished the post of Chief of the Defence Staff (CDS) in 1997 and his successor, Sir Charles Guthrie, was the first officer not to be promoted upon appointment as CDS, although he was promoted to the honorary rank of field marshal in June 2012.

The most recent promotions to field marshal came in 2012, eighteen years after the moratorium on routine promotions to the rank, when Queen Elizabeth II promoted Prince Charles, her son and heir apparent, to the five-star ranks in all three services, in recognition of support provided for her in her capacity as Head of the British Armed Forces. At the same time, Guthrie, who relinquished the post of CDS and retired from active service in 2001, was promoted to honorary field marshal. In June 2014 former Chief of the Defence Staff Lord Walker of Aldringham was also promoted to honorary field marshal.

Although the rank of field marshal is not used in the Royal Marines, the insignia is used on the uniform of the Captain General, the ceremonial head of the corps (equivalent to colonel-in-chief).

Insignia of rank

The rank insignia of a field marshal in the British Army comprises two crossed batons in a wreath of laurel leaves, with a crown above. In some other countries, historically under the sphere of British influence, an adapted version of the insignia is used for field marshals, often with the crown being replaced with an alternative cultural or national emblem. On appointment, British field marshals are awarded a gold-tipped baton which they may carry on formal occasions.

List of field marshals

The vast majority of officers to hold the rank of field marshal were professional soldiers in the British Army, though eleven served as officers in the British Indian Army. At least fifty-seven field marshals were wounded in battle earlier in their careers, of whom 24 were wounded more than once, and eight had been prisoners of war. Fifteen future field marshals were present at the Battle of Vitoria, where the Duke of Wellington earned the rank, and ten others served under Wellington at the Battle of Waterloo. However, only thirty-eight held independent commands in the field, and just twelve served as Commander-in-Chief of the Forces (the pre-1904 professional head of the army) or Chief of the Imperial General Staff during a major war.

Four field marshals—Sir Evelyn Wood, Sir George White, Earl Roberts, and Lord Gort—had previously received the Victoria Cross (VC), the United Kingdom's highest and most prestigious award for gallantry "in the face of the enemy". Wood, a famously injury-prone officer, was awarded the VC for two actions in 1858 in which he first attacked a group of rebels in India and later rescued an informant from another group of rebels. White, a cavalry officer, led two charges on enemy guns in Afghanistan in 1879, while Gort, of the Grenadier Guards, commanded a series of attacks while severely wounded during the First World War in 1918. Roberts received his VC for actions during the Indian Mutiny.

Wellington, 44 at the time of his promotion, was the youngest non-royal officer to earn the rank of field marshal. Charles Moore, 1st Marquess of Drogheda was the oldest, promoted at the age of 91, while a further twenty-three officers were promoted to field marshal in their eighties. Wellington was also the only field marshal to become Prime Minister of the United Kingdom.

No officer whose career was spent in the British Army has ever reached the rank of field marshal without having served in the cavalry, infantry, Royal Armoured Corps, Royal Artillery or Royal Engineers. One non-British officer has been appointed field marshal in the British Army—Ferdinand Foch of France, in recognition of his contributions in the First World War—while one, Sir William Robertson, held every rank in the British Army, from private soldier to field marshal.

See also

 British and U.S. military ranks compared
 British Army Other Ranks rank insignia
 British Army officer rank insignia

Notes

References
Footnotes

Works cited